Rembrandt Cecil Robinson (October 2, 1924 – May 8, 1972) was a United States Navy officer who was stationed in the Tonkin Gulf during the Vietnam War. Robinson died in 1972, in a helicopter crash; he was the only Navy flag officer killed during the Vietnam War. Robinson has a memorial cross in Arlington National Cemetery.

Robinson was the last American flag officer to die as a result of official duty in a combat zone until Lieutenant General Timothy J. Maude was killed at the Pentagon in the September 11 attacks of 2001, and the last killed in the line of duty abroad until Major General Harold J. Greene in Afghanistan in 2014.

Early life and education
Robinson was born October 2, 1924, in Clearfield, Pennsylvania, the son of Issac, a World War I navy veteran, and Helen Bailey Robinson. He attended Pennsylvania State College for a time before enlisting in the Navy Reserve as a midshipman in 1943. He was commissioned in the Navy Reserve as an ensign in 1944.

Naval career

World War II
Upon commissioning, Robinson was assigned to the amphibious force, first on the staff of Amphibious Forces, Pacific Fleet, then aboard the Landing Ship, Tank LST-485. While aboard LST-485, he participated in significant combat operations, including the Invasion of Okinawa, and also participated in the post-war evacuation of Chinese refugees fleeing from advancing Communist forces. Following this tour, Robinson served at the headquarters of the Fourth and Twelfth Naval Districts, and served aboard three additional LSTs, before transferring to the destroyer force.

Korean War
In 1949, Robinson reported aboard  as chief engineer. While aboard English, Robinson received the first of two Bronze Star Medals, for meritorious service after North Korean shore batteries attacked the ship at Wonson. Upon completing this tour in 1952, Robinson served at the Bureau of Naval Personnel. Following his studies, Robinson reported for duty at the assistant head of the Command Policy Section, Strategic Plans Division, within the Office of the Chief of Naval Operations.

In 1959, Robinson reported aboard , then under construction at the Avondale Yards in Louisiana, as prospective commanding officer, and assumed command upon the ship's commissioning on November 25, 1959. In January 1962, Robinson returned to Washington for a second tour of duty, this time as Objective Plans Officer, Strategic Plans Division, of the Office of the Chief of Naval Operations; during this tour, he completed his college education, receiving a Bachelor of Arts degree in Social Sciences from George Washington University. In August 1964, Robinson returned to the West Coast as Executive Assistant and Aide to the Commander In Chief, Pacific Fleet; during this tour he received the first of two Distinguished Service Medals.

Vietnam War
Robinson assumed command of Destroyer Squadron 31 in September 1968. During this tour, he received his second Bronze Star, for leading the squadron during combat operations in Vietnam. In 1969, he returned to Washington for a third time, as a member of the Chairman's Staff Group within the Office of the Joint Chiefs of Staff; during this assignment, he served as the liaison between Admiral Thomas H. Moorer, the then-Chairman of the Joint Chiefs of Staff, and President's Assistant for National Security Affairs Henry Kissinger. While serving in this capacity, Robinson received a second Distinguished Service Medal, and in 1970 was promoted to rear admiral; at the time of his promotion, he was one of the youngest flag officers in the Navy, and marked the third time he had been selected for early promotion. Also during this tour, Robinson helped update potential plans for the mining of Haiphong Harbor, first conceived in 1965. In 1971, Robinson returned to sea, taking command of Cruiser-Destroyer Flotilla 11 and Commander of the Seventh Fleet Cruisers and Destroyers (COMCRUDESGRUSEVENTHFLEET).

Operation Pocket Money
While heading up Kissinger's military staff in 1969, Robinson had helped to update plans for the blockading or mining of Haiphong Harbor, originally drawn in 1965. The plans became the basis of Operation Pocket Money, which called for the mining of Haiphong Harbor and a naval gunfire attack of the Do Son Peninsula. On May 8, 1972, President Richard Nixon ordered Pocket Money executed.

Death
Later that evening, as the helicopter was attempting to land aboard Providence with the four men aboard, an engine failure caused it to crash into the Gulf of Tonkin. Robinson was recovered, but pronounced dead aboard the ship. McCullough survived the crash, along with the helicopter's crew; Taylor and Leaver were never found. Robinson's memorial cross is located in Arlington National Cemetery, Section MF, Site 30-5. Robinson was survived by his wife, Joan, and his children.

Awards
Robinson's awards include:
 Navy Distinguished Service Medal with Gold Star
 Bronze Star Medal with Gold Star and "V" device
 Meritorious Unit Commendation
 Joint Service Commendation Medal
 American Campaign Medal
 Asiatic-Pacific Campaign Medal
 World War II Victory Medal
 Navy Occupation Service Medal with Asia and Europe clasps
 China Service Medal
 National Defense Service Medal with bronze star
 Korean Service Medal
 United Nations Service Medal
 Vietnam Service Medal with silver star
 Republic of Vietnam Campaign Medal with device
 Korean Presidential Unit Citation
 Republic of Vietnam Gallantry Cross
 National Order of Vietnam Knight (posthumous)

References

1924 births
1972 deaths
United States Navy admirals
United States Navy personnel of World War II
United States Navy personnel of the Korean War
United States Navy personnel of the Vietnam War
American military personnel killed in the Vietnam War
Victims of helicopter accidents or incidents
People from Clearfield, Pennsylvania
Burials at Arlington National Cemetery
Military personnel from Pennsylvania